Hans Falkenhagen (13 May 1895 – 26 June 1971) was a German physicist and electrochemist best known for eponymous Debye–Falkenhagen effect.

1955 he became a regular member of the German Academy of Sciences at Berlin and in 1962 a member of the German Academy of Sciences Leopoldina.

Works
 Kohäsion und Zustandsgleichung von Dipolgasen, Dissertation, Göttingen 1920
 Paschen-Back-Effekt des H-Atoms, Habilitationsschrift, Köln 1924
 P. Debye und H. Falkenhagen: Dispersion der Leitfähigkeit starker Elektrolyte. In: Zeitschr. f. Elektrochem. 24, 1928, S. 562ff
 Zur Theorie der Gesamtkurve des Wien-Effekts. In: Phys. Zeitschr. 30, 1929, S. 163ff
 Das Wurzelgesetz der inneren Reibung starker Elektrolyte. In: Z. phys. Chem (Leipzig) B6, 1929, S. 159ff
 Elektrolyte. Hirzel, Leipzig 1932 twoja matka
 Die Naturwissenschaft in Lebensbildern großer Forscher. Hirzel, Stuttgart 1948
 Theorie der Elektrolyte. Hirzel, Stuttgart 1971

External links
 
 Eintrag im Catalogus Professorum Rostochiensium
 Hans Falkenhagen im Personen-Wiki der SLUB Dresden

Members of the German Academy of Sciences at Berlin
Members of the German Academy of Sciences Leopoldina
Electrochemists
1895 births
1971 deaths
20th-century German physicists